Victor Schivert (1863–1926?) was a Romanian painter and illustrator known for genre subjects and portraits.

Schivert painted illustrations of the Thirty Years War. One of his paintings, Kriegsbeute, was reported stolen in 2005 from Bohemia (Czech Republic).

His father was the painter Albert Gustav Schivert (1826–1881).

Gallery

References

External links

Artchive Web Gallery
Artnet

1863 births
1926 deaths
19th-century Romanian painters
20th-century Romanian painters